Gordon Frederick Love (born 23 December 1873, date of death unknown) was a French rower. He competed in the men's coxed pair event at the 1900 Summer Olympics.

References

External links

1873 births
Year of death missing
French male rowers
Olympic rowers of France
Rowers at the 1900 Summer Olympics
Rowers from Paris
Place of death missing